The A142 is a road that runs from Newmarket in Suffolk to Chatteris in Cambridgeshire.

References

Roads in England